Events of 2016 in Somaliland.

Incumbents
President: Ahmed Mohamed Mohamoud 
Vice President: Abdirahman Saylici
Speaker of the House: Abdirahman Mohamed Abdullahi
Chairman of the House: Suleiman Mohamoud Adan
 Chief Justice: Adan Haji Ali
 Chief of Staff of Armed Forces: 
Ismail Shaqalle (until August 15)
Nuh Ismail Tani (since August 15)

Events

January
January 13
Ahmed Mohamed Mohamoud addressed his last State of the Nation as President of Somaliland to a joint session of Parliament of Somaliland.
January 20
Aynaba police arrest 385 illegal Ethiopian migrants as well as five human smugglers in a large-scale operation.
January 21
Somaliland police arrests seven gunmen who hijacked a vehicle on the road between Hargeisa and Berbera.

February
February 13
Voters registration of the forth-coming presidential election has begun in Awdal region, which will last 28 days, with 138 locations scheduled to take place.

March
 March 15
Somaliland and Djiboutian coast guards clash over illegal fishing, killing one and wounding two.
March 19
The number of people who died of thirst in Awdal region due to the long drought in the country has reached eight people.

April
April 19
A delegation from neighboring Somalia, including members of the civil society, business organizations and religious leaders arrived in Hargeisa, by delivering US$1 Million aid to drought victims of the country.

May
May 15
The National Electoral Commission, along with the officials of the Somaliland political parties, announces that the first phase of the voters registration of Hargeisa and Salahlay District was concluded, which lasted 14 days.

June
June 14
Three people die and twenty-one others are injured after heavy rainfall with storms in Hargeisa; the storms also lifted the roofs of many buildings, while several others collapsed, including schools.

July
July 23
The 10th installment of the annual Hargeisa International Book Fair held in Gulied Hotel in hargeisa, with the theme of Leadership; the guest country is Ghana.

August
August 13
Voters registration of the upcoming presidential election has begun in Sool region, becoming the last region to hold it.

September
September 23
Commercial businesses in the town of Gar-adag are looted and fields burned on the outskirts of the town; the damage was reported to have caused by one of two communities that had recently been in conflict.

October
October 23
Minister of Finance handed a US$ 4 Million to the National Electoral Commission that is formerly promised by Silanyo's administration for the commission to carry out its duties.

November
November 8
At least 32 people were injured (25 civilians & 7 police soldiers) as a result of violent clashes between supporters of Hawd and Daad-madheedh, during a football match in the Somaliland Regional Games at Hargeisa Stadium.

December
December 3
The President of Somaliland makes a major reshuffle within his administration by presidential decree, including ministers, deputy ministers, state ministers, governors, director generals, advisors and chairmen of national agencies.

Deaths
December 18
Boon Hersi – playwright and comedian.
July 18
Shey Mire Daar – singer.

References

 
2010s in Somaliland
Somaliland
Somaliland